James Ian McTaggart (10 May 1920 – 8 November 1964) was an Australian rules footballer who played with North Melbourne in the Victorian Football League (VFL).

Notes

External links 

Ian McTaggart's playing statistics from The VFA Project

1920 births
1964 deaths
Australian rules footballers from Victoria (Australia)
Williamstown Football Club players
North Melbourne Football Club players
Preston Football Club (VFA) players